Giuseppe Momo (1875–1940) was an Italian architect and engineer, perhaps best known for the Scala Momo in the Vatican Museums cast by Ferdinando Marinelli Artistic Foundry of Florence and the Pontifical Ethiopian College.

References

1875 births
1940 deaths
20th-century Italian architects
Vatican Museums